This is a list of public holidays in the Gambia.

Public holidays

Variable dates

2020
Good Friday – April 10
Easter Monday – April 13
Qadr Night (Revelation of the Quran) – May 20
Korité (Breaking of the Ramadan fast) – May 24
Tabaski (Feast of the Sacrifice) – starts July 31
Ashura – starts sundown, August 28
Malwid – starts at sundown, October 28
2021
Good Friday – April 2
Easter Monday – April 5
Qadr Night (Revelation of the Quran) – May 9
Korité (Breaking of the Ramadan fast) – May 24
Tabaski (Feast of the Sacrifice) – starts July 20
2022
Good Friday – April 15
Easter Monday – April 18
Qadr Night (Revelation of the Quran) – April 29
Korité (Breaking of the Ramadan fast) – May 2
Tabaski (Feast of the Sacrifice) – starts July 9
2023
Good Friday – April 7
Easter Monday – April 10
Qadr Night (Revelation of the Quran) – April 17
Korité (Breaking of the Ramadan fast)– April 21
Tabaski – starts June 28
2024
Good Friday – March 29
Easter Monday – April 1
Qadr Night (Revelation of the Quran) – April 6
Korité (Breaking of the Ramadan fast)– April 10
Tabaski (Feast of the Sacrifice) – starts June16
2025
Good Friday – April 18
Easter Monday – April 21
2026
Good Friday – April 3
Easter Monday – April 6

References 

Gambia
Gambian culture
Gambia